The Bjerrum length (after Danish chemist Niels Bjerrum 1879–1958 ) is the separation at which the electrostatic interaction between two  elementary charges is comparable in magnitude to the thermal energy scale, where  is the Boltzmann constant and  is the absolute temperature in kelvins.  This length scale arises naturally in discussions of electrostatic, electrodynamic and electrokinetic phenomena in electrolytes, polyelectrolytes and colloidal dispersions.

In standard units, the Bjerrum length is given by

For water at room temperature  , so that

In Gaussian units,  and the Bjerrum length has the simpler form

The relative permittivity εr of water decreases so strongly with temperature that the product (εr·T) decreases. Therefore, in spite of the (1/T) relation, the Bjerrum length λB increases with temperature, as shown in the graph.

See also
 Debye length
 Debye–Hückel equation
 Shielding effect
 Screening effect
 Electrical double layer, (EDL)
 Brownian motion

References

Physical chemistry
Colloidal chemistry